Martina Godályová (born 15 May 1975 in Šaľa) is a Slovak former basketball player who competed in the 2000 Summer Olympics.

References

1975 births
Living people
Slovak women's basketball players
Olympic basketball players of Slovakia
Basketball players at the 2000 Summer Olympics
Sportspeople from Šaľa